Kathrine Baumann is an American actress, model, and couture handbag designer.  She established Kathrine Baumann Beverly Hills (KBBH), a haute-couture accessorie and handbag collection.  Several of her creations have been purchased by celebrities and have been carried to red-carpet events.

Baumann creates accessories in the American pop art style. She includes cartoon characters and well-known product logos in her fashion designs. She designed a Titanic-shaped minaudiere, which was carried to events surrounding the release of the 1997 feature film.

Baumann created several seasons of her Americana Collection and characters such as Betty Boop, Mickey and Minnie Mouse, Miss Piggy, Barbie and Ms. Green M&M were made into crystal-encrusted minaudieres.

Early life and education

Baumann grew up in Independence, Ohio.  She was a cheerleader in high school, and in 1966 was named Miss Independence. Kathrine is a 1971 graduate of Bowling Green State University, Bowling Green, Ohio.

Career
Kathy Lynn Baumann became Miss Ohio 1969.  At the 1970 "Miss America Pageant" (held in September, 1969) Baumann became first runner-up to Miss America winning both  talent and swimsuit awards. Her talent presentation consisted of a space travel gymnastic routine to "Those Were the Days."  (The moon landing was still fresh in everyone's minds, having occurred only a few months prior to the pageant.) She later traveled to Vietnam as part of USO with Bob Hope to entertain the troops.

Baumann became an actress, and guest-starred on a variety of television shows, including season 2 M*A*S*H as Nancy Sue Parker in the 1974 episode entitled 'Henry In Love', The Tonight Show Starring Johnny Carson, Knight Rider, Simon and Simon, The Fall Guy, Banacek, Fantasy Island, Trapper John M.D., CHiPs, The Dukes of Hazzard, Vegas and several movies of the week.  Her film credentials include a co-starring role with Richard Harris and Chuck Connors in 99 and 44/100% Dead (1974), and roles in Chrome and Hot Leather (1971), The Thing with Two Heads (1972), The Take (1974) and Slashed Dreams (1975).

Baumann appeared on TV Guide Channel and E! Entertainment's live 2003 Countdown from the Red Carpet Academy Awards pre-show. Other notable television appearances include a segment on NBC's EXTRA, ABC's Inside Edition, and appearances on Fox's Good Day Los Angeles, KTLA Channel 5's Morning News, CNN's Larry King Live and Business Unusual.  Baumann also made regular television appearances at local stations as a featured guest when she was traveling for trunk shows to display her collection.

Modeling 
Kathrine's modeling work has been featured in publications such as Time, People, US Weekly, Vogue, Cosmopolitan, InStyle, Town & Country, Allure, Nylon, Las Vegas Magazine, LA Confidential, Gotham, Elle, WWD, and W, and she has appeared on CBS' Day & Date, ABC's Caryl & Marilyn, The Home & Family Show, Variety, V Life, The Los Angeles Times, Los Angeles Magazine, and Orange County.  She was regularly featured in Accessories Magazine. Trade publications such as JCK, Luxury, Professional Jeweler and Modern Jeweler covered Baumann's work regularly from season to season.

She has also served as the national spokeswoman for Schlitz, Rubbermaid, the Family Fitness Centers, and Chrysler. She was featured on several posters along with Farrah Fawcett.

Kathrine Baumann Beverly Hills
In 1988,  Baumann founded K. Baumann Design in Beverly Hills, California (now known as Kathrine Baumann Beverly Hills), where she designs luxury evening bags (minaudieres) and other women's accessories.  The handbags were made in California and Italy.

In 2001 Baumann sued a group of entrepreneurs in Manhattan who were selling unauthorized copies of her designer handbags.

Her work was included in a fashion exhibit at Stephens College.

References

External links 
 
 Official website

Year of birth missing (living people)
Living people
Actresses from Ohio
Female models from Ohio
American fashion designers
People from Independence, Ohio
Bowling Green State University alumni
American women fashion designers
21st-century American women